Michiel Hendrik de Kock (29 January 1898, Malmesbury, Cape Colony —18 September 1976, Cape Town) was the third Governor of the South African Reserve Bank. His term of office was from 1 July 1945 to 30 June 1962. All South African banknotes issued during the reign of Queen Elizabeth II carry his signature. The Union of South Africa became the Republic of South Africa under the Constitution of the First Republic on 31 May 1961. His signature is also carried on the first issue of Rand banknotes, which were first issued on 14 February 1961. His successor was Dr. G. Rissik. His son, Dr. G.P.C. de Kock also served as a Governor of the South African Reserve Bank.

References

1898 births
1976 deaths
Afrikaner people
People from Malmesbury, Western Cape
20th-century South African businesspeople
Governors of the South African Reserve Bank